Events in the year 1836 in Mexico.

Incumbents 
 Miguel Barragán – President of Mexico until resignation due to illness February 27
 José Justo Corro – President of Mexico starting on March 2

Governors
 Aguascalientes: Pedro García Rojas
 Chiapas: Mariano Montes de Oca/Clemente Aceituno
 Chihuahua: 
 Coahuila: José Rafael Eça y Múzquiz
 Durango:  
 Guanajuato: 
 Guerrero: 
 Jalisco: José Antonio Romero/Antonio Escobedo
 State of Mexico:  
 Michoacán: 
 Nuevo León: Juan Nepomuceno de la Garza y Evía/Joaquín García
 Oaxaca: 
 Puebla: 
 Querétaro: José Rafael Canalizo 
 San Luis Potosí: 
 Sinaloa: 
 Sonora: 
 Tabasco: 
 Tamaulipas: José Antonio Fernández Izaguirre/José Guadalupe de Samano	 
 Veracruz: 
 Yucatán: 
 Zacatecas:

Events

 February 23 – Battle of the Alamo: The siege of the Alamo begins in San Antonio, Texas.
 March 2 – At the Convention of 1836, the Republic of Texas declares independence from Mexico.
 March 6 – The Battle of the Alamo ends; 189 Texans are slaughtered by about 1,600 Mexicans.
 March 27 – Texas Revolution: Goliad massacre – Antonio López de Santa Anna orders the Mexican army to kill about 400 Texans at Goliad, Texas
 April 21 – Texas Revolution: Battle of San Jacinto – Republic of Texas forces under Sam Houston defeat troops under Mexican General Antonio López de Santa Anna. (Santa Anna and hundreds of his troops are taken prisoner along the San Jacinto River the next day.)
 April 22 – Texas Revolution: A day after the Battle of San Jacinto, forces under Texas General Sam Houston capture Mexican General Antonio López de Santa Anna.

Notable births

 May 16 – Juan de la Luz Enríquez, Governor of Veracruz (died 1892)
 June 9 – Manuel de Aspiroz, statesman, Senator, and diplomat was born in Puebla, Puebla (died 1905)

Notable deaths
 March 1 – Miguel Barragán, President of Mexico (born 1789)

Notes

 
Years of the 19th century in Mexico
Mexico
Mexico
1830s in Mexico